Palmar Arriba is a town in the Santiago province of the Dominican Republic.

Sources 
 – World-Gazetteer.com

Populated places in Santiago Province (Dominican Republic)